Space Top 10 Countdown is a TV show on the Canadian cable television channel Space. It counts down the Top Ten characters of a movie genre and shows clips of these films/characters. It had eleven episodes in its first season and a second season of nine episodes.

Kim Poirier and Jonathan Llyr took turns hosting the show.

Cast

Kim Poirier as Herself - On-Air Presenter

Jonathan Llyr as Himself - On-Air Presenter

Season 1 episodes

1.1 - Most Malicious Movie Monsters (aired 19 May 2006) hosted by Kim Poirier

1.2 - Super Heroes (aired 23 September 2006) hosted by Jonathan Llyr

1.3 - Movie Villains (aired 30 September 2006) hosted by Kim Poirier

1.4 - Anti-Heroes (aired 7 October 2006) hosted by Jonathan Llyr

1.5 - Movie Heroes (aired 14 October 2006) hosted by Kim Poirier

1.6 - Movie Heroines (aired 21 October 2006) hosted by Jonathan Llyr

1.7 - Killer Cyborgs (aired 28 October 2006) hosted by Kim Poirier

1.8 - Sidekicks (aired 4 November 2006) hosted by Jonathan Llyr

1.9 - Movie Aliens (aired 11 November 2006) hosted by Kim Poirier

1.10 - Blockbuster Visual FX (aired 18 November 2006) hosted by Jonathan Llyr

1.11 - Video Game Movies (aired 25 November 2006) hosted by Kim Poirier

Season 2 episodes

2.1 - Magic and Make-Believe (aired 11 February 2007) hosted by Kim Poirier

2.2 - The Doctors (aired 18 February 2007) hosted by Jonathan Llyr
 
2.3 - Chicks That Kick (aired 25 February 2007) hosted by Kim Poirier

2.4 - Small Screen Saviours (aired 4 March 2007) hosted by Jonathan Llyr
 
2.5 - Some Strings Attached (aired 18 March 2007) hosted by Kim Poirier

2.6 - The Sky is Falling (aired 25 March 2007) hosted by Jonathan Llyr
 
2.7 - Unsung SF Movies (aired 1 April 2007) hosted by Jonathan Llyr

2.8 - Three or More (aired 8 April 2007) hosted by Kim Poirier

2.9 - Action Scenes (aired 22 April 2007) hosted by Kim Poirier

External links
Space Top 10 Countdown official website 
Space Top 10 Countdown IMDb
Space Top 10 Countdown TV.com Page
Space Top 10 Countdown TVShowsOnDVD.com Voting Page

CTV Sci-Fi Channel original programming
Entertainment news shows in Canada